This is a list of the Muay Thai practitioners who participated at the 2022 World Games in Birmingham, Alabama, United States from 15 to 17 July 2022. 89 Muay Thai practitioners competed in the Games across 12 events.

Male Muay Thai practitioners

Female Muay Thai practitioners

Notes

References 

Lists of Muay Thai practitioners
Muaythai at the 2022 World Games